Hamza Dewan Choudhury (born 1 October 1997) is an English professional footballer who plays as a defensive midfielder for EFL Championship side Watford, on loan from Leicester City. He has made over 80 appearances for Leicester since 2017, and won the FA Cup in 2021. He has represented England at under-21 level.

Early life
Choudhury was born in Loughborough, Leicestershire.

Club career

Leicester City

Choudhury began his career at the Leicester City Academy, and at the age of 16 was reportedly monitored by a number of top European clubs. He joined League One leaders Burton Albion on a one-month loan deal on 27 February 2016. He made his debut in the Football League later that same day, coming on as a 77th-minute substitute for Tom Naylor in a 0–0 draw with Walsall at the Pirelli Stadium.
On 6 August 2016, Choudhury signed another loan deal with Burton Albion for the 2016–17 season. On the same day, Choudhury featured in Burton Albion's first ever Championship game, claiming an assist in a 4–3 defeat against Nottingham Forest.

On 19 September 2017, Choudhury debuted for Leicester City coming on as substitute in the 82nd minute of an EFL Cup 3rd round home win against Liverpool. On 28 November 2017, Choudhury made his Premier League debut for Leicester coming on as substitute in the 83rd minute of a home win against Tottenham Hotspur. His first Premier League start came on 14 April 2018, in a 2–1 away defeat to Burnley.

On 30 August 2019, Choudhury signed a new four-year contract with Leicester. On 1 January 2020, Choudhury scored his first senior goal for Leicester, an outside the box strike in the 86th minute, in a 3–0 away win at Newcastle United.

On 22 October 2020, Choudhury made his first appearance in a European competition, coming off the bench in the 71st minute against Zorya Luhansk. He became the first footballer of Bangladeshi descent to make an appearance in a European competition by doing so. On 29 October, Choudhury scored a 39th-minute volley against AEK Athens, winning the match 2–1. He became the first footballer of Bangladeshi descent to score in one of the two major UEFA club competitions, the first British Asian to score in European competitions since Michael Chopra in the defunct UEFA Intertoto Cup, and the first British Asian to score in the current UEFA competitions.

On 11 April 2021, Choudhury was one of three players dropped from Leicester's squad for the game against West Ham United after breaching COVID-19 protocols. On 15 May 2021, he came on as an 82nd-minute substitute in the 2021 FA Cup Final, which Leicester won 1–0 for his first career honour. He and teammate Wesley Fofana both celebrated draped in the flag of Palestine, during the 2021 Israel–Palestine crisis.

Watford

On 10 August 2022, Choudhury joined Championship club Watford on loan for the season, with the option to make the move permanent the following summer. He made his debut two days later in a 1–0 home win over Burnley, and was praised by manager Rob Edwards.

International career
On 26 May 2018, Choudhury made his debut for the England national under-21 football team, coming on as a substitute during the 2–1 win against China under-21 in the 2018 Toulon Tournament. Choudhury started for England in the next match of the tournament, a 0–0 draw against Mexico.

On 27 May 2019, Choudhury was included in England's 23-man squad for the 2019 UEFA European Under-21 Championship but was shown a straight red card for a reckless tackle during the second half of the opening 2–1 defeat to France in Cesena.

Although eligible to play for Bangladesh and Grenada, Choudhury said in October 2019 that he intended to pursue an international career with England, stating: "To play for England is my biggest dream, to represent the senior team".

Personal life
Choudhury is of Bangladeshi-Grenadian ancestry. He was raised in a traditional Bengali Muslim household by his mother and stepfather and has visited Bangladesh since he was a child. His maternal ancestral home is in Bahubal, Habiganj District in Bangladesh. His stepfather is also Bengali. Choudhury can speak Bengali with a good degree of fluency. He is eligible to play for the Grenada national team through his biological father.

Choudhury is a Sunni Muslim, and attended evening madrasa during his youth. He has stated that before leaving the changing room for a match, he recites parts of the Qur'an in Arabic such as the Verse of the Throne and various duas.

In April 2019 he apologised for historical offensive tweets. He was later charged with misconduct by the FA, and fined £5,000 and put on an educational course.

He and his wife have three children born in 2018, 2020, and 2023.

Career statistics

Honours
Leicester City
FA Cup: 2020–21
FA Community Shield: 2021

England U21
Toulon Tournament: 2018

See also
British Asians in association football

References

External links

1997 births
Living people
Sportspeople from Loughborough
Footballers from Leicestershire
English footballers
Association football midfielders
Leicester City F.C. players
Burton Albion F.C. players
Watford F.C. players
English Football League players
Premier League players
FA Cup Final players
England under-21 international footballers
Black British sportspeople
English Muslims
British Asian footballers
English people of Bangladeshi descent
English sportspeople of Grenadian descent
21st-century Bengalis
21st-century Muslims